The 2013–14 Liberian First Division League (known as the LFA-Cellcom First Division League for sponsorship reasons) is the 41st season of the Liberian Premier League, the Liberian professional league for association football clubs, since the league's establishment in 1956. The season was expected to start on Sunday 20 October 2013 but was pushed back to commence on Sunday, 27 October 2013 instead. The 2013–2014 season will conclude on Sunday 23 February 2014. The fixtures were announced on 12 October 2013.

Teams 
A total of 12 teams are contesting the league, including 10 sides from the 2013 season and two promoted from the 2013 Second Division League. On 24 July 2013, NPA Anchors and Keitrace FC earned promotion from the 2013 Second Division League. Keitrace FC claimed a promotion place, after finishing second behind Barrack Young Controllers II – a feeder side of Barrack Young Controllers. Keitrace FC will be playing in the First Division for the first time while NPA Anchors would be returning to the top flight after they were relegated during the 2012 Liberian Premier League season.

The two teams replaced Gedi & Sons F.C. and Nimba United F.C. who were both relegated to the Second Division.

Stadia and locations 

Note: Fatu FC were acquired by Ghana's Red Lions FC on 5 November, hence the name change on all fixtures.

Personnel

Note: Flags indicate national team as has been defined under FIFA eligibility rules. Players may hold more than one non-FIFA nationality.

League table

Winner of the 2013–14 Liberian FA Cup will qualify for the 2015 CAF Confederation Cup.

Season statistics

Scoring
 First goal of the season: Christopher Jackson for Keitrace FC against Barrack Young Controllers (27 October 2013)
 Largest winning margin: 4 goals
 Red Lions FC 1–5 LPRC Oilers (27 October 2013)
 Barrack Young Controllers 5–1 Mighty Blue Angels (2 November 2013)
 LPRC Oilers 6–2 Mighty Blue Angels (15 December 2013)
 Highest scoring game: 8 goals
 LPRC Oilers 6–2 Mighty Blue Angels (15 December 2013)
 Most goals scored in a match by a single team: 6 goals
 LPRC Oilers 6–2 Mighty Blue Angels (15 December 2013)
 Most goals scored in a match by a losing team: 2 goals
 NPA Anchors 3–2 Jubilee FC (2 November 2013)
 Mighty Blue Angels 2–3 Red Lions FC (13 November 2013)
 LPRC Oilers 6–2 Mighty Blue Angels (15 December 2013)

Top scorers
Note: Players with same number of goals sorted by lastname

Clean sheets

Player
Note: Players with same number of clean sheets sorted by lastname

Club
 Most clean sheets: 4
 Monrovia Club Breweries

Discipline

Player
Most yellow cards:
Most red cards: 1
Charles Togba (NPA Anchors)
Joseph Hina (Invincible Eleven)
Prince Mulbah (Mighty Blue Angels)

Club

Most yellow cards:
Most red cards: 1
NPA Anchors
Invincible Eleven
Mighty Blue Angels

See also
Liberian Premier League
Liberia Football Association

References

External links
LFA National Leagues
Liberia Football Association

Football competitions in Liberia